Stanley Majid (born 14 December 1929) is a Burmese boxer. He competed in the men's light welterweight event at the 1952 Summer Olympics.

Professional boxing record

References

External links
 

1929 births
Possibly living people
Burmese male boxers
Olympic boxers of Myanmar
Boxers at the 1952 Summer Olympics
Place of birth missing (living people)
Asian Games medalists in boxing
Boxers at the 1958 Asian Games
Asian Games bronze medalists for Myanmar
Medalists at the 1958 Asian Games
Light-welterweight boxers